CAWU may refer to:

 CAWU Learning Center, in Egypt
 Center for Arab-West Understanding, in Egypt
 Central Amalgamated Workers' Union, in New Zealand

See also
 Association of Professional, Executive, Clerical and Computer Staff, previously the Clerical and Administrative Workers Union
 Dewa Cawu (?–1673), regent